The Tupé Sustainable Development Reserve is a sustainable development  reserve (RDS) in the state of Amazonas, Brazil.

Location

It includes the communities of Livramento, Julião, Central, Tatu, São João do Lago do Tupé and Agrovida.

Vegetation includes igapó and terra firma forest dominated by large trees.
Tupé beach is a sand bar at the mouth of the Tupé stream where it enters the Rio Negro.
The beach, which can only be accessed by boat, varies in width from  depending on the river's water level.
It provides an excellent place for swimming, diving and boating, and receives many visitors on weekends and holidays.

As of 2016 the population was about 5,000.
Residents say SEMMAS, the municipal environmental authority, prohibits planting crops or harvesting wood for construction.
However, SEMMAS states that family-based agriculture and fishing are allowed.
Efforts to develop ecotourism have not been encouraged.
There are vacation homes in the reserve, mostly owned by wealthy entrepreneurs from Manaus, a source of friction with the residents.

History

The location was once home to indigenous people such as the Manaós, now extinct, and the Tarumã.
The present residents began to occupy the region in the 1970s.
In 1990 municipality declared Tupé Beach  an area of relevant ecological interest.
In 1995  municipal law 321 created the Tupé Environmental Unit.

The Tupé Sustainable Development Reserve was created in 2005 by municipal decree 8.044 to preserve the site and develop the communities through ecotourism and sustainable agriculture.
It is administered by SEMMAS (Secretaria Municipal de Meio Ambiente e Sustentabilidade), a department of the municipality of Manaus.
The purpose was to mitigate the environmental impacts of real estate speculation and illegal exploitation of the natural resources, and support sustainable development of the traditional residents, with emphasis on combating poverty.

A draft management plan was completed in 2008, but was not approved under the administrations of successive mayors.
The reserve became part of the Lower Rio Negro Mosaic, created in 2010.
As of 2016 the management plan, which would define zoning and rules of use and management of natural resources, had still not been issued. This meant that the residents could not legally hunt, fish or grow crops for sale, but largely rely on government payments and occupations such as making handicrafts for sale to tourists.

Notes

Sources

2005 establishments in Brazil
Sustainable development reserves of Brazil
Protected areas of Amazonas (Brazilian state)